Harry Hope was a Scottish politician.

Harry Hope may also refer to:

Harry Hope, character in The Iceman Cometh
Harry Hope, character in Doomsday Machine (film)

See also
Henry Hope (disambiguation)